The following is a list of tours and notable live acts performed by British singer George Michael (1963-2016).

Tours

Charity Concerts

Other Concerts

References

See also
List of best-selling music artists

Live performances
Live performances
Michael, George